Jepkoech or Chepkoech is a name of Kenyan origin meaning "born at sunrise" that may refer to:

Eunice Jepkoech Sum (born 1988), Kenyan runner and 2013 world champion in the 800 metres
Margaret Jepkoech Kamar, Kenyan National Assembly member for the Orange Democratic Movement
Ruth Jepkoech Kutol (born 1973), Kenyan marathon runner

See also
Kipkoech, related surname for males born at sunrise. The son of Kipkoech is arap Koech

Kalenjin names